2011 Regional League Division 2 League Southern Region is the 3rd season of the League competition since its establishment in 2009. It is in the third tier of the Thai football league system.

Changes from last season

Team changes

Promoted club
Phuket were promoted to the 2011 Thai Division 1 League.

Relegated club

Narathiwat were relegated from the 2010 Thai Division 1 League.

Teams

Stadia and locations

League table

References

External links
 Football Association of Thailand

Regional League South Division seasons
Sou